"Staying Power" is a 1999 song (and his last single during his lifetime) recorded by Barry White and written by Rory Holmes and Joey Paschaland, one of the singles from his album of the same name. Although not a major hit for White, it did manage to chart. The song is in the key of B flat minor.

1999 singles
Barry White songs
1999 songs